Dimanche à Bamako is the fourth album by Malian duo Amadou & Mariam featuring, and produced by, French singer Manu Chao. It was released on the Nonesuch Records label on 2 August 2005.

The album features guests such as Ivorian reggae star Tiken Jah Fakoly and Italian ska/jazz trumpeter Roy Paci.

Background
French singer Manu Chao heard Amadou & Mariam's music on the radio and decided that he wanted to work with them.

Reception
In a review for Allmusic, Chris Nickson gave the album a star rating of 4 out of 5. Joe Tangari of Pitchfork Media gave the album a rating of 8 out of 10 and said that "it would be a crime if it didn't rocket Amadou & Mariam straight to stardom." Spin named the album the 33rd best album released in 2005. Mojo's David Hutcheon gave the album a rating of four stars out of five.

The album won the BBC Awards for World Music Best Album Award 2006 and helped the duo win the African section of the same awards that year. It was also listed as one of Songlines' 10 best world music albums of the year and was nominated for a 2006 Grammy Award for Best Contemporary World Music Album.

Observer Music Monthly listed it as the 39th best album of the 2000s.

Track listing
 "M'Bifé" (Mariam Doumbia, Manu Chao) — 2:11
 "M'Bifé Balafon" (Manu Chao) — 1:58
 "Coulibaly" (Amadou Bagayoko) — 3:18
 "La Réalité" (Bagayoko) — 3:32
 "Sénégal Fast Food" (Bagayoko, Chao, Doumbia) — 4:19
 "Artistiya" (Doumbia) — 3:11
 "La Fête au Village" (Bagayoko) — 4:11
 "Camions Sauvages" (Bagayoko, Chao, Doumbia) — 4:08
 "Beaux Dimanches" (Bagayoko) — 3:31
 "La Paix" (Bagayoko) — 4:19
 "Djanfa" (Bagayoko, Chao, Doumbia) — 4:13
 "Taxi Bamako" (Chao) — 3:44
 "Politic Amagni" (Bagayoko, Chao, Ousmane Cissé, Tiemoko Traoré) — 4:56
 "Gnidjougouya" (Doumbia) — 3:45
 "M'Bifé Blues" (Chao, Doumbia) — 5:21

Personnel

Music
Nicolas Auriauit — trumpet
Amadou Bagayoko — guitar, vocals
Samou Bagayoko — choir
Manu Chao — guitar, vocals, choir
Ousmane Cissé — choir
Boubacar Dembele — djembe
Mariam Doumbia — vocals, choir
Roberto Shilling Pollo Duarte — piano
Tiken Jah Fakoly — vocals
Laurent Griffon — bass
Stéphane Hamokrane — choir
Alain Hatot — clarinet, flute, baritone saxophone
Pierre Hauthe — trombone
Renaud Lacoche — saw
Loïc Landois — harmonica
Cédric Lesouquet — double bass
Ibrahim Maalouf — trumpet
François Regis Matuszenski — keyboards
Roy Paci — trumpet
Stephane San Juan — drums, tabla
Philippe Teboul — percussion
Tiemoko Traoré — choir

Production
Philippe Avocat — assistant
Manu Chao — programming, producer, engineer, editing
Tony Cousins — mastering
Antoine Halet — engineer
Laurent Jaïs — engineer, mixing
Marc Antoine Moreau — engineer, executive producer, artistic director
Jean-Loup Morette — assistant
Design
Marie Laure Dagnaux — photography

Charts
Album

Singles

References

2005 albums
Amadou & Mariam albums
Because Music albums
Nonesuch Records albums